Lunar Pool (known as  in Japan) is a sports video game. It was developed by Compile for the Nintendo Entertainment System and MSX. The game combines pool (pocket billiards) with aspects of miniature golf. The object is to knock each ball into a pocket using a cue ball. The game offers sixty levels, and the friction of the table is adjustable (thus the lunar reference in the title, along with Moon-related background imagery within the game). The game was re-released for the Wii on the North American Virtual Console on October 22, 2007.

Gameplay
Lunar Pool is played in boards of different shapes. The player has to shoot the cue ball to knock other colored balls into the pockets. One life is lost whenever the player either fails to pocket a ball on three consecutive shots or pockets the cue ball. Completing a level awards one extra life, or two if the player has pocketed at least one ball on every shot.

The value of each ball is determined by its number and the displayed "Rate" value, which starts at 1 and increases after every shot in which the player pockets at least one ball. Failing to do so resets the Rate to 1. Bonus points are awarded for completing a level without a miss.

The game ends after all lives are lost or 60 levels have been completed, whichever occurs first.

Modes
Lunar Pool can either be played alone, against another player, or against the computer. If the game is played against another player or the computer, players take turns shooting the cue ball. If one player fails to knock at least one of the colored balls into a pocket, or pockets their own cue ball, then it becomes the opponent's turn.

The game includes an adjustable friction setting, which determines the rate at which balls slow down after being hit.

Legacy 
In the Mexican soap opera María la del Barrio, José María (Roberto Blandón) plays Lunar Pool on the NES.

References

External links

1985 video games
Compile (company) games
Cue sports video games
Fantasy sports video games
Miniature golf video games
Pony Canyon games
NEC PC-8801 games
Nintendo Entertainment System games
Virtual Console games
MSX games
Multiplayer and single-player video games
Video games developed in Japan